Herbert Vogel (August 16, 1922 – July 22, 2012) and Dorothy Vogel (born 1935), once described as "proletarian art collectors," worked as civil servants in New York City for more than a half-century while amassing what has been called one of the most important post-1960s art collections in the United States, mostly of minimalist and conceptual art. Herbert Vogel died on July 22, 2012, in a Manhattan nursing home.

Early years

Herbert Vogel, known as Herb, was the son of a Russian Jewish garment worker from Harlem. He never finished high school and, after serving in the U.S. Army during World War II, worked nights as a clerk sorting mail for the United States Postal Service until his retirement in 1979. Dorothy Faye Hoffman is the daughter of an Orthodox Jewish stationery merchant from Elmira, New York. She received a bachelor's degree from Syracuse University and a master's degree from the University of Denver, both in library science, and worked until her retirement in 1990 as a librarian for the Brooklyn Public Library.

Herbert and Dorothy married in 1962, a year after they met, in Elmira. Early in their marriage, they took painting classes at New York University, but later gave up painting in favor of collecting. They had no children, lived very frugally, and shared their living space with fish, turtles, and cats named after famous painters.

Early acquisitions

One of their earliest acquisitions was a work by Giuseppe Napoli that Herb bought before marrying Dorothy. They bought a ceramic piece by Pablo Picasso to celebrate their engagement. A piece called Crushed Car Parts by American sculptor John Chamberlain was their first post-wedding acquisition.

The couple used Dorothy's income to cover their living expenses and instead of eating in restaurants or travelling, they used Herb's income, which peaked at $23,000 annually,  for art. They did not buy for investment purposes, choosing only pieces they personally liked and could carry home on the subway or in a taxi. They bought directly from the artists, often paying in installments. Once, according to The Washington Post, they received a collage from environmental artist Christo in exchange for cat-sitting. In 1975, they held the first exhibition of their collection, at the Clocktower Gallery in lower Manhattan.

The collection

They amassed a collection of over 4,782 works, which they displayed, and also stored in closets and under the bed, in their rent-controlled one-bedroom apartment on Manhattan's Upper East Side.  Though their focus was mainly conceptual art and minimalist art, the collection also includes noteworthy post-minimalist work. Their collection eventually came to include work from artists such as pop artist Roy Lichtenstein, photographers Cindy Sherman and Lorna Simpson, minimalist Robert Mangold and post-minimalist Richard Tuttle.

In 1992, the Vogels decided to transfer the entire collection to the National Gallery of Art because it charges no admission, does not sell donated works, and they wanted their art to belong to the public. In late 2008, they launched The Dorothy and Herbert Vogel Collection: Fifty Works for Fifty States along with the National Gallery of Art, the National Endowment for the Arts, and the Institute of Museum and Library Services. The program donated 2,500 works to 50 institutions across 50 states and was accompanied by a book with the same name.

Documentaries
Megumi Sasaki has made two documentaries about the Vogels.

Released in 2008, Herb and Dorothy focused on the story of the Vogels, how they amassed their collection, and their donation of it to the National Gallery of Art. It won six awards at five different film festivals.

Released in 2013, Herb and Dorothy 50x50 continued from when the previous documentary had ended, and concentrated on the distribution of fifty works from the collection to one museum in each of the fifty states within the U.S. as well as the role that the Vogels and some of the artists had in their exhibition.

Friendships with notable artists

The Vogels bought art from and became close friends with influential New York artists of the second half of the 20th century including Sol LeWitt, Richard Tuttle, and many of the artists listed below.

List of recipient museums
The recipient museums of the Vogel Collection's Fifty Works for Fifty States program are:

 Alabama – Birmingham Museum of Art
 Alaska – University of Alaska Museum of the North
 Arizona – Phoenix Art Museum
 Arkansas – Arkansas Arts Center
 California – Museum of Contemporary Art, Los Angeles
 Colorado – Colorado Springs Fine Arts Center
 Connecticut – Yale University Art Gallery
 Delaware – Delaware Art Museum
 Florida – Miami Art Museum
 Georgia – High Museum of Art
 Hawaii – Honolulu Museum of Art
 Idaho – Boise Art Museum
 Illinois – University Museum, Southern Illinois University
 Indiana – Indianapolis Museum of Art
 Iowa – Museum of Art Cedar Rapids
 Kansas – Spencer Museum of Art
 Kentucky – Speed Art Museum
 Louisiana – New Orleans Museum of Art
 Maine – Portland Museum of Art
 Maryland – Academy Art Museum
 Massachusetts – Harvard Art Museums
 Michigan – University of Michigan Museum of Art
 Minnesota – Weisman Art Museum
 Mississippi – Mississippi Museum of Art
 Missouri – Daum Museum of Contemporary Art
 Montana – Yellowstone Art Museum
 Nebraska – Joslyn Art Museum
 Nevada – Marjorie Barrick Museum of Art
 New Hampshire – Hood Museum of Art
 New Jersey – Montclair Art Museum
 New Mexico – New Mexico Museum of Art
 New York – Albright-Knox Art Gallery
 North Carolina – Weatherspoon Art Museum
 North Dakota – Plains Art Museum
 Ohio – Akron Art Museum
 Oklahoma – Oklahoma City Museum of Art
 Oregon – Portland Art Museum
 Pennsylvania – Pennsylvania Academy of the Fine Arts
 Rhode Island – Rhode Island School of Design Museum
 South Carolina – Columbia Museum of Art
 South Dakota – South Dakota Art Museum
 Tennessee – Memphis Brooks Museum of Art
 Texas – Blanton Museum of Art
 Utah – Nora Eccles Harrison Museum of Art
 Vermont – Robert Hull Fleming Museum
 Virginia – Virginia Museum of Fine Arts
 Washington – Seattle Art Museum
 West Virginia – Huntington Museum of Art
 Wisconsin – Milwaukee Art Museum
 Wyoming – University of Wyoming Art Museum

List of artists
The artists included in the Vogels' gifts are:

 Gregory Amenoff
 Eric Amouyal
 William Anastasi
 Joe Andoe
 Carl Andre
 Stephen Antonakos
 Richard Anuszkiewicz
 Nancy Arlen
 Anne Arnold
 Richard Artschwager
 Jo Baer
 Carel Balth
 Will Barnet
 Robert Barry
 Zigi Ben-Haim
 Lynda Benglis
 Joseph Beuys
 James Bishop
 Ronald Bladen
 Dike Blair
 William (Bill) Bollinger
 Gary Bower
 Lisa Bradley
 Richmond Burton
 André Cadéré
 Loren Calaway
 Peter Campus
 McWillie Chambers
 Ann Chernow
 Chryssa
 Michael Clark (Clark Fox)
 John Clem Clarke
 Charles Clough
 Kathleen Cooke
 Peggy Cyphers
 Gene Davis
 Claudia de Monte
 Stuart Diamond
 Lois Dodd
 Koki Doktori
 Rackstraw Downes
 Robert Duran
 Benni Efrat
 William Fares
 R.M. Fischer
 Joel Fisher
 Richard Francisco
 Adam Fuss
 Charles Gaines
 Pinchas Cohen Gan
 Dixie Friend Gay
 Jon Gibson
 David Gilhooly
 Michael Goldberg
 Ronald Gorchov
 Sidney Gordin
 Dan Graham
 Denise Green
 Rodney Alan Greenblat
 Peter Halley
 William L. Haney
 Don Hazlitt
 Jene Highstein
 Stewart Hitch
 Jim Hodges
 Tom Holland
 John Hultberg
 Ralph Humphrey
 Bryan Hunt
 David Hunter
 Peter Hutchinson
 Will Insley
 Patrick Ireland aka Brian O’Doherty
 Ralph Iwamoto
 Neil Jenney
 Bill Jensen
 Martin Johnson
 Joan Jonas
 Tobi Kahn
 Stephen Kaltenbach
 Steven Karr
 Steve Keister
 Alain Kirili
 Mark Kostabi
 Moshe Kupferman
 Cheryl Laemmle
 Ronnie Landfield
 Michael Lash
 John Latham
 Michael Lathrop
 Wendy Lehman
 Annette Lemieux
 Jill Levine
 Sol LeWitt
 Roy Lichtenstein
 Robert Lawrance Lobe
 Michael Lucero
 Robert Mangold
 Sylvia Plimack Mangold
 Andy Mann
 Antoni Miralda
 William Morehouse
 Kyle Morris
 Vik Muniz
 Takashi Murakami
 Catherine E. Murphy
 Elizabeth Murray
 Forrest Myers
 Giuseppe Napoli
 Joseph Nechvatal
 Richard Nonas
 David Novros
 Nam June Paik
 Raymond Parker
 Betty Parsons
 Henry C. Pearson
 Joel Perlman
 Richard Pettibone
 Lil Picard
 Larry Poons
 Katherine Porter
 Lucio Pozzi
 David Rabinowitch
 David Reed
 Edda Renouf
 Edward Renouf
 Judy Rifka
 Rodney Ripps
 Alexis Rockman
 Stephen Rosenthal
 Christy Rupp
 David Salle
 John Salt
 Alan Saret
 David Sawin
 F. (Frank) L. Schröder
 Hans Jürgen [H.A.] Schult
 Peter Schuyff
 Barbara Schwartz
 Joel Shapiro
 Judith Shea
 Cindy Sherman
 Alan Shields
 Yinka Shonibare
 James Siena
 Lorna Simpson
 Tony Smith
 Keith Sonnier
 Richard Stankiewicz
 Robert Stanley
 Pat Steir
 Gary Stephan
 Michelle Stuart
 Donald Sultan
 Lori Taschler
 Hap Tivey
 John Torreano
 Daryl Trivieri
 Richard Tuttle
 Lynn Umlauf
 Leo Valledor
 Richard Van Buren
 Ruth Vollmer
 Ursula von Rydingsvard
 Robert Marshall Watts
 Lawrence Weiner
 Bettina Werner
 Joseph White
 Thornton Willis
 Terry Winters
 Tod Wizon
 Martin Wong
 Betty Woodman
 Mario Yrissary
 Larry Zox
 Joe Zucker
 Michael Zwack

See also
 1992 in art

References
 National Gallery of Art, The Dorothy and Herbert Vogel Collection: Fifty Works for Fifty States, Washington DC, National Gallery of Art, 2008, 
 Paoletti. John T., From Minimal to Conceptual Art: Works from the Dorothy and Herbert Vogel Collection, Washington DC, National Gallery of Art, 1994,

Footnotes

External links 
 Vogel 50/50
 The Dorothy and Herbert Vogel papers, 1960-1990, Archives of American Art, Smithsonian Institution
  Herbert Vogel, Fabled Art Collector, Dies at 89; New York Times

American art collectors
American people of Russian-Jewish descent
Jewish American art collectors
Women art collectors
Married couples